Tore Ørjasæter (3 March 1886 – 29 February 1968) was a Norwegian educator and poet.

Biography
Ørjasæter was born at Skjåk in Oppland, Norway.  The son of a teacher, he attended Voss folk high school and qualified as a teacher before becoming a writer. 

Ørjasæter's poetry was written in Nynorsk in the Norwegian folk tradition. His writing is influenced by Ivar Aasen, Aasmund Olavsson Vinje and Per Sivle. Like these, he was concerned with modernization of traditional society, and the conflict between individual and community, but he differed from these poets in a more positive attitude to the new society. Towards the end of his life, he also started experimenting with more modernist writing. His main work is considered to be the poem Gudbrand Langleite.

Personal life
Ørjasæter was married in 1921 to Aaslaug Skaaden (1896–1988). He then became the father of literary critic  (1925- 2006) and the father-in-law of  professor  Tordis Ørjasæter.

Works

 1908 - Ættar-arv (Ancestor-heritage) – poetry
 1910 - I dalom (In the valleys) – poetry
 1913 - Gudbrand Langleite – trilogy, first part
 1915 - Manns kvæde (Man's chanting) – poetry
 1920 - Bru-millom (Between bridges) – trilogy, second part
 1925 - Skiringsgangen (The cleansing walk)
 1927 - Skuggen (The shadow) – trilogy, third part
 1932 - Elvesong (River song) – poetry
 1945 - Livsens tre (The tree of life) – poetry
 1948 - Christophoros – play
 1949 - Den lange bryllupsreisa (The long honeymoon) – play

Awards
Statens kunstnerlønn from 1929
Gyldendal's Endowment 1946
Dobloug Prize 1952
Gudbrandsdal's culture prize of 1957
Melsom-prisen 1968

References

See also 

 Å, Vestland, Vestland, a Norwegian popular song with lyrics by Ørjasæter

1886 births
1968 deaths
People from Skjåk
Norwegian literary critics
Norwegian educators
Norwegian male poets
Nynorsk-language writers
20th-century Norwegian poets
20th-century Norwegian male writers
Dobloug Prize winners